The Sundays were an English alternative rock band, formed in the late 1980s, which released three albums throughout the 1990s.

The band's beginnings came with the meeting of singer Harriet Wheeler and guitarist David Gavurin while attending Bristol University. Wheeler had played gigs with Cruel Shoes, an early incarnation of the band Jim Jiminee. The duo soon augmented the band with bassist Paul Brindley and drummer Patrick Hannan.

The Sundays secured a recording contract with Rough Trade Records. Their debut single was "Can't Be Sure". Their first album, Reading, Writing and Arithmetic, was released in 1990, along with their next single "Here's Where the Story Ends", and became a UK top 5 hit. The band were often misidentified as being the Primitives, another UK based alternative rock band from Coventry as their vocalists had very similar voices.

With Rough Trade's financial troubles and the band's decision to manage themselves, the Sundays' next single, "Goodbye", did not emerge until 1992. Their next album, Blind, arrived the same year, reaching the UK top 15. The single "Love" reached number 2 on the US Modern Rock charts. The band toured in support of these recordings.

In 1997 their third album, Static & Silence, was followed by the release of their most successful single to date, "Summertime", which made the UK top 15. The album itself reached the UK top 10. However, the band has been on a lengthy hiatus since those releases, with Wheeler and Gavurin focusing on raising their two children.

History

1988: Formation
Vocalist Harriet Wheeler and guitarist David Gavurin met as students at Bristol University in the mid-1980s. Wheeler was from Reading, the daughter of an architect and a teacher, and studied English literature. Gavurin was from Wembley and actively pursued a degree in the Romance languages, particularly French and Spanish. The two fell in love and began living together. Following graduation they wrote music in their free time while collecting unemployment benefits. Except for Wheeler's vocal duties in a band called Jim Jiminee, the couple had no musical background. Commenting on his desire to compose, Gavurin said, "It was something I'd always wanted to do, although I never wanted to be in a band when I was younger, like many kids do. It just dawned on me gradually." Wheeler displayed similar feelings: "There was never a time I wanted to be incredibly famous, or in a pop group," she said. "It just seemed a great thing to do to spend time working on something that's your own."

After the couple completed several songs – and migrated to London – they enlisted the support of bassist Paul Brindley and drummer Patrick Hannan, who had also attended Bristol University. Hannan's brother, Nick had also been a member of Jim Jiminee, which briefly featured Wheeler as vocalist (see paragraph above). The band chose the name "The Sundays" as it was the only one everyone could agree upon. Demo tapes were sent out to several London clubs after the group felt energized by their efforts; Gavurin stated in a Rolling Stone interview that "by the end of the year we were thinking, 'Hang on a minute, some of this [music] is good!'" Responses to the tape were enthusiastic and an employee at Vertigo Club offered the band an opening slot for an upcoming show in August 1988. "By chance there were three reviewers from the top music papers there," said Wheeler. "They were supposed to review the main band, but instead they wrote about us." The group subsequently became the focus of a record label bidding war, which author Peter Buckley described as a "frenzy". They eventually signed with Rough Trade Records and had a distribution deal signed for the United States with DGC Records.

1989–1990: Reading, Writing and Arithmetic
The Sundays released their first single "Can't Be Sure" in January 1989. It topped the British indie charts and received acclaim as one of the best singles of 1989. The group performed three songs in a session with popular disc jockey John Peel. These songs would later turn up on their debut album, Reading, Writing and Arithmetic. The group worked on their debut for over a year. "A lot of bands who get signed, who have been playing the circuit for years, have 30 songs for the first album," said Gavurin. "But we didn't have enough for our first album, let alone our second. We can't write to deadline. You can't force a whole load of songs out quickly." Asked whether the band felt pressured when working on the album, Wheeler responded, "No, because to start off with, we're far more critical of ourselves than anyone else, and that's more a concern to us than what the press think." Gavurin also commented: "The main pressure we felt was with the single, and even then, we thought, well, they're either going to like it or they're not, and there's not much we can do to influence that."

Reading, Writing and Arithmetic was released in January 1990 and became a commercial success, reaching number 4 on the UK charts and peaking at number 39 on the Billboard 200 in the United States. It went on to sell over half a million copies worldwide. Critical reception was very positive; Rolling Stone writer Ira Robbins referred to it as "an alluring slice of lighter-than-air guitar pop, a collection of uncommonly good songs graced by Harriet Wheeler's wondrous singing." The single "Here's Where the Story Ends" was particularly successful in the USA due to radio play and MTV rotation. The Sundays devoted nearly a year to an "exhausting" promotional tour, which encompassed America, Europe, and Japan. The tour was considered successful, although it was not without some mishaps; a London show had to be rescheduled due to Wheeler losing her voice and the group experienced some amusement when a Dallas, Texas, show was advertised with the slogan "See The Sundays on Sunday with ice-cream sundaes".

1991–1993: Blind
The band experienced some hardships leading up to the recording of their second album. In 1991 Rough Trade Records went bankrupt, which caused the band to sign with Parlophone Records in the UK. Their debut went out of print in the UK and would stay that way until 1996. Constant touring coupled with their decision to manage themselves hampered the group's creative output, which was already slow due to Gavurin and Wheeler, the main songwriters, "being chained by pokiness and perfectionism when it [came] to writing and recording music." Additionally, the band kept a "low public profile", which fuelled rumours that the group had disbanded. The Sundays eventually released a new single, "Goodbye", a minor hit, in Autumn 1992. The release came almost three years after their last UK show. The "Goodbye" B-side, a cover of The Rolling Stones' "Wild Horses", also appeared on the US release of Blind as well as in the movie Fear (1996), on the 1999 soundtrack album for the popular television series Buffy the Vampire Slayer, and in the episode 01x01 of the series Friends from College (2017).

Their next album, entitled Blind, was finally released in October 1992. The album experienced commercial success similar to their debut when it peaked at number 103 on the Billboard 200, and sold nearly half a million copies. Critical reception was also positive, but some critics thought the album lacked the quality songwriting of its predecessor. Despite Blind's initial appeal with audiences, it drifted off the charts by the summer of 1993. The Sundays toured Britain in the winter of 1992. The shows were "rapturously received by fans starved of fresh product or gigs." An American tour was greeted with sold-out shows. Gavurin explained that they weren't necessarily attempting to promote the new album: "A lot of people didn't see us the first time we played over here, and they want to hear earlier material. So we're playing half and half." In the end the tour was cut short in light of exhaustion and homesickness.

1994–1997: Static and Silence
The band holidayed in Thailand and decided to take a break upon returning to England. It would be five years before another album was released. During this time the only appearance of the band was their cover of "Wild Horses" by The Rolling Stones appearing in a 1994 American Budweiser television commercial. Gavurin and Wheeler expressed a desire to settle down. Wheeler gave birth to the couple's daughter, Billie, in March 1995. They also built a recording studio in their home, not only to save on the cost of renting a studio, but also to expand their creative freedoms. Their third, and most recent album, Static & Silence, was released in the autumn of 1997 to mixed reviews. Although the band retained much of the same sound that they developed on previous albums, they added horns to a number of tracks for Static & Silence. The album was not as successful as Reading, Writing and Arithmetic, however the single "Summertime" became their most successful hit to date on the UK chart and achieved a top 10 spot on the US Alternative Rock chart. It was The Sundays' third most successful single in the US, behind "Here's Where the Story Ends" (which made it to number 1 on the US Alternative Rock chart) and "Love" (which made it to number 2).

2014: Possible return
In April 2014, Adam Pitluk, the editor of American Airlines' magazine American Way, tracked down and conducted an interview with Wheeler and Gavurin in which he put forward the idea of a reunion. They responded "First let's see if the music we’re currently writing ever sees the light of day, and then we can get on to the enjoyable globe-trotting-meets-concert-planning stage."

On 10 October 2014, during an interview on BBC Radio 6 Music's Radcliffe & Maconie radio programme, David Baddiel described Dave Gavurin as his "oldest mate" and stated that "they [Dave and Harriet] are doing music, but whether they ever put that out there, I’ve no idea. They're the most paranoid people about actually putting stuff out there." Fans who have seen the Sundays live will remember hearing one or two tracks that were never released. "Something More" and "Turkish" featured in many of their sets, but the only copies are live bootlegs.

In an interview with the C86 Show Podcast released on August 18th 2020, Patrick Hannan revealed that Harriet and David had "never stopped making music" and that there are a number of tracks on which he had played drums. Patrick stated that these recordings may never be released.

Band members
 Paul Brindley – bassist
 David Gavurin – guitarist
 Patrick (Patch) Hannan – drummer
 Harriet Wheeler – vocalist

Discography

Studio albums

Singles

B-sides/unreleased songs 
"Can't Be Sure" [demo] (b-side of "Cry")
"Don't Tell Your Mother"  (b-side of "Can't Be Sure", eventually appearing also on DGC Rarities Vol. 1)
"Gone" (b-side of "Summertime")
"Here's Where the Story Ends" [Black Session] (b-side of "Wild Horses" – US cassette single)
"Here's Where the Story Ends" [live] (b-side of "Summertime")
"I Kicked a Boy" (b-side of "Can't Be Sure", released on Reading, Writing and Arithmetic)
"Black Sessions" (Live 1992 - Album) (French radio show - France Inter)
"Life Goes On" (b-side of "Cry")
"Noise" (b-side of "Goodbye")
"Nothing Sweet" (b-side of "Summertime")
"Skin & Bones" [live] (b-side of "Summertime")
"So Much" (only on the US version of Static and Silence)
"Something More" (unreleased)
"Through the Dark" (b-side of "Cry")
"Turkish" (only performed live, and at almost every concert on the Blind and Static and Silence tours)
"Wild Horses" (b-side of "Goodbye", appearing also on US copies of Blind)
"You're Not the Only One I Know" [demo] (b-side of "Cry")

References

British indie pop groups
Dream pop musical groups
Jangle pop groups
English alternative rock groups
Female-fronted musical groups
Geffen Records artists
Musical groups established in 1988
Musical groups disestablished in 1997
Musical groups from London
Parlophone artists
Rough Trade Records artists
Musical_groups_from_Bristol